Alexandros Voilis (born 26 May 2000) is a Greek professional footballer who plays as a forward for Super League club Panetolikos.

References

2000 births
Living people
Greek footballers
Greece youth international footballers
Greek expatriate footballers
Super League Greece players
Liga Portugal 2 players
Olympiacos F.C. players
Casa Pia A.C. players
Association football forwards
Greek expatriate sportspeople in Portugal
Expatriate footballers in Portugal
People from West Attica
Footballers from Attica
Olympiacos F.C. B players
Expatriate footballers in Luxembourg
Greek expatriate sportspeople in Luxembourg
Jeunesse Esch players